Carl Lund (23 September 1884 – 29 May 1940) was a Swedish wrestler. He competed at the 1908 Summer Olympics and the 1912 Summer Olympics.

References

External links
 

1884 births
1940 deaths
Olympic wrestlers of Sweden
Wrestlers at the 1908 Summer Olympics
Wrestlers at the 1912 Summer Olympics
Swedish male sport wrestlers
Sportspeople from Gothenburg
20th-century Swedish people